Bocca d'Arno (mouth of the Arno) is the traditional denomination of the late course of the Arno river, in Tuscany, central Italy. It is located near Marina di Pisa.

Geography of Tuscany